The 1798 United States elections occurred in the middle of Federalist President John Adams's term. Members of the 6th United States Congress were chosen in this election. The election took place during the First Party System. The election saw no significant partisan change, with the Federalists keeping control of both houses of Congress.

See also
1798–99 United States House of Representatives elections
1798–99 United States Senate elections

References

1798 elections in the United States
1798
United States midterm elections